The discography of The Bangles, an American all-female band, consists of five studio albums, ten compilation albums, one extended play, twenty-five singles, and three video albums.

Albums

Studio albums

Compilation albums

3 × 4 (2018 compilation with Dream Syndicate, Rain Parade and The Three O'Clock) Yep Roc Records - #27 Billboard Independent Albums

Extended plays

Singles

Video albums

Music videos

References

External links 
 

Discography
Discographies of American artists
Pop music group discographies
Rock music group discographies